This is a list of common land in London, England. Most common land in England is registered for the purposes of the Commons Act 2006, but some commons are protected under separate local acts, such as Wimbledon and Putney Commons, which are protected under the Wimbledon and Putney Commons Act 1871.

Registered land
The following are common lands registered for the purposes of the Commons Act 2006.

Notes

References

 
London-related lists